The 1927–28 season was Stoke City's 28th season in the Football League and the eighth in the Second Division.

Record season ticket sales were recorded prior to the start of the 1927–28 season as supporters were buoyed following last season's Third Division North title win. Stoke had a good return to the Second Division, finishing 5th in the table, five points from promotion, and also reached the quarter final of the FA Cup losing to Arsenal. Charlie Wilson top-scored this season with a club-record 38 goals.

Season review

League
The 1927–28 season saw Stoke back within one Division of the top flight, although a heavy bank overdraft of £13,000 meant that they couldn't go out and bolster the squad, Mather being forced to rely on the players who had served him well last season. However, chairman Sherwin assured the fans that he would spend the money if weakness became apparent but he stated that he would not be able to join in the transfer fee spiral that was gathering pace elsewhere. On a brighter note Stoke reported record season ticket sales for the new campaign.

Stoke made a fantastic start back in the Second Division beating Southampton 6–3 in the first match, this was followed up with 4–2 and 3–0 victories as Stoke started the season in fine form. Performances did eventually drop off and the team hit an inconsistent spell just before Christmas but then won six matches back to back. Stoke enjoyed a successful end to the campaign finishing in 5th position. Stoke's cup run perhaps cost them a genuine promotion challenge but nevertheless it was a good season with the club's bank balance improving and the team showing great consistency with six players playing 40 or more League games. The reserves also had a fine season, winning the Central League title for the first time.

FA Cup
After a number of pretty terrible performances in the FA Cup in the past few seasons, the 1927–28 season saw a marked improvement as Stoke beat Gillingham 6–1, Bolton Wanderers 4–2, Manchester City 1–0 before losing 4–1 to Arsenal in the quarter final stage. Nevertheless, the board were happy with the club's performance and income which the cup run generated.

Final league table

Results
Stoke's score comes first

Legend

Football League Second Division

FA Cup

Squad statistics

References

Stoke City F.C. seasons
Stoke